Jasper Culpeper (by 1508 – 1556/1564), of Penshurst, Kent and Arlington, Sussex, was an English politician.

Family
His career was helped by his cousin, the courtier, Thomas Culpeper. It was not hindered when Thomas was executed for adultery with Henry VIII's fifth wife, Catherine Howard.

Career
He was a Member (MP) of the Parliament of England for East Grinstead in 1547 and November 1554.

References

16th-century deaths
People from Penshurst
People from Wealden District
English MPs 1547–1552
English MPs 1554–1555
Year of birth uncertain